Scientific transliteration, variously called academic, linguistic, international, or scholarly transliteration, is an international system for transliteration of text from the Cyrillic script to the Latin script (romanization).  This system is most often seen in linguistics publications on Slavic languages.

Details 
The scientific transliteration system is roughly as phonemic as is the orthography of the language transliterated. The deviations are with щ, where the transliteration makes clear that two phonemes are involved, and џ, where it fails to represent the (monophonemic) affricate with a single letter. The transliteration system is based on the Gaj's Latin alphabet used in Serbo-Croatian, in which each letter corresponds directly to a Cyrillic letter in Bosnian, Montenegrin and Serbian official standards, and was heavily based on the earlier Czech alphabet. The Cyrillic letter х, representing the sound [x] as in Bach, was romanized h in Serbo-Croatian, but in German-speaking countries the native digraph ch was used instead. It was codified in the 1898 Prussian Instructions for libraries, or Preußische Instruktionen (PI), which were adopted in Central Europe and Scandinavia. Scientific transliteration can also be used to romanize the early Glagolitic alphabet, which has a close correspondence to Cyrillic.

Scientific transliteration is often adapted to serve as a phonetic alphabet.

Scientific transliteration was the basis for the ISO 9 transliteration standard. While linguistic transliteration tries to preserve the original language's pronunciation to a certain degree, the latest version of the ISO standard (ISO 9:1995) has abandoned this concept, which was still found in ISO/R 9:1968 and is now restricted to a one-to-one mapping of letters. It thus allows for unambiguous reverse transliteration into the original Cyrillic text and is language-independent.

The previous official Soviet romanization system, GOST 16876-71, is also based on scientific transliteration but used Latin h for Cyrillic х instead of Latin x or ssh and sth for Cyrillic Щ, and had a number of other differences. Most countries using Cyrillic script now have adopted GOST 7.79 instead, which is not the same as ISO 9 but close to it.

Representing all of the necessary diacritics on computers requires Unicode, Latin-2, Latin-4, or Latin-7 encoding.

Table

( ) Letters in parentheses are older or alternative transliterations. Ukrainian and Belarusian apostrophe are not transcribed. The early Cyrillic letter koppa (Ҁ, ҁ) was used only for transliterating Greek and its numeric value and was thus omitted. Prussian Instructions and ISO 9:1995 are provided for comparison.

Unicode encoding is:
  for the Cyrillic apostrophe
  to transliterate the soft sign
  to transliterate the hard sign

See also
 Romanization of Belarusian
 Romanization of Bulgarian
 Romanization of Greek
 Romanization of Macedonian
 Romanization of Russian
 Romanization of Serbian
 Romanization of Ukrainian
  (PI)
 ALA-LC romanization for Russian

Notes

References 
 (Winter 2003) "Transliteration", in Slavic and East European Journal, 47 (4):backmatter—every issue of this journal has a transliteration reference in the back, including a table labelled “ISO Transliteration System”, although it is different from the latest version of ISO 9:1995.
 IDS (Informationsverbund Deutschschweiz, 2001) Katalogisierungsregeln IDS (KIDS), Anhänge, “IDS G.4: Transliteration der slavischen kyrillischen Alphabete” (Archive). Universität Zürich. URL accessed on 2009-05-27 (PDF format, in German)—ISO/R 9 1968 standardization of scientific transliteration
 Timberlake, Alan (2004), A Reference Grammar of Russian, Cambridge University Press, .

External links 
 Transliteration history—history of the transliteration of Slavic languages into Latin alphabets
 
 Transliteration of Non-Roman Scripts
 CyrAcademisator Bi-directional online transliteration of Russian for ALA-LC (diacritics), scientific, ISO/R 9, ISO 9, GOST 7.79B and others. Supports Old Slavonic characters
 Ukrainian Transliteration — online service of scientific transliteration to and from Ukrainian. Also supports ISO 9, BGN/PCGN, ALA-LC and other standards of Ukrainian transliteration. (in Ukrainian)

Slavic languages